E. africana may refer to:
 Epimyrma africana, an ant species endemic to Algeria
 Etmopterus africana, the shorttail lanternshark, a shark species found in the western Pacific

See also
 Africana (disambiguation)